MOSCOT is a five-generation, family-owned, American luxury eyewear brand, headquartered in New York City, specializing in optical frames and sunglasses. It was founded in the Lower East Side neighborhood of Manhattan in 1915 by Hyman Moscot, which makes it one of the oldest local businesses in New York City, as well as the 21st oldest eyewear company in the world still operating today.

History

Early years, 20th century 
In 1899, when he was in his 20s, Jewish-Belarusian immigrant Hyman Mushcot arrived in New York City through Ellis Island, allegedly where his surname was shortened and changed to Moscot. (In reality, he voluntarily changed his surname himself later on.) He settled down in Manhattan’s Lower East Side neighborhood, and having already worked in the optical business in his home country, he began selling ready-made eyeglasses from a wooden pushcart on Orchard Street. He spoke only Yiddish, and served the many immigrants that poured into the Lower East Side at the turn of the century.
In 1910, Hyman married fellow immigrant Leba. Five years later, with a family rapidly growing, he opened his first retail store at 94 Rivington Street, filling its windows with signs, posters, and drawings of giant eyes and glasses. (Because of this, some journalists have speculated that the shop, which sat close to the Williamsburg bridge, was F. Scott Fitzgerald’s inspiration for the Doctor T. J. Eckleburg billboard in The Great Gatsby, which the novelist was writing during the same years.)
Hyman and Leba had six children. In 1925, at 15 years old, Hyman’s youngest son, Solomon, nicknamed "Sol," took over the business, and in 1935, moved the shop to its location at 118 Orchard Street, where it would be located for nearly eight decades. The bright yellow sign with giant, black-rimmed glasses that adorned its storefront became synonymous with the brand, the neighborhood, and downtown New York, and while most of New York's historical businesses fell during the Great Depression, the Moscots made it through the 1930s.

Sol's son, Joel, began presiding over the House of Moscot in 1951. Charming, dedicated, and devoted to his customers, Joel would manage Moscot for over fifty years‚ overseeing the Shop's activities, while conveying the family's values to his sons, who would soon become the fourth generation of Moscots to take the helm. The oldest, Harvey, graduated from Boston New England College of Optometry in 1986, and began working as a doctor at 118 Orchard. The youngest, Kenny, entered the business in 1991 with a bachelor's degree in finance. In 1996, with father Joel still at the company, Moscot expanded, opening a second shop at 69 W. 14th Street, on the corner of Sixth Avenue, in downtown Manhattan, which remains the company's flagship location.

21st century 
After Joel Moscot retired in 2003, the family company rebranded from Sol Moscot to Moscot. Together, the fourth generation Moscot siblings reinvented what was once a neighborhood optical shop into what is now a global brand.

After the death of his brother in 2010, Harvey Moscot became president of the company. Due to gentrification in the Lower East Side, Moscot moved from 118 Orchard Street across Delancey Street to 108 Orchard Street where it remains today. The shop was eventually included in the Tenement Museum’s historical tour of the Lower East Side. In 2013, Moscot opened its third flagship store, this time in the Cobble Hill neighborhood of Brooklyn, the façade of which is reminiscent of the family’s first shop at 94 Rivington Street. Moscot later opened shops in Seoul, South Korea, Tokyo, Japan, and London, England.

Harvey's son, Zack Moscot studied industrial and product design at the University of Michigan in Ann Arbor and began working full time at Moscot in 2013. He is now the company’s chief eyewear designer, representing the fifth generation Moscot to join the brand.

Eyewear 
The frames, eyeglasses and sunglasses together, are categorized under the MOSCOT Originals and MOSCOT Spirit Collections. Materials vary from acetate to metal and beta-titanium.
In the spring of 2008, the brand teamed up with fashion designer Chris Benz for a limited edition run of four special colors for its classic frame, the "Nebb"; only 200 were available, each numbered for authenticity. The company has since engaged in eyewear collaborations with Simon Miller, Myles Kennedy, Tariq Trotter, Johan Lindeberg for BLK DNM, Common Projects, Helio Ascari, and other notable and influential brands and figures.

Artists and celebrities 
Moscot is popularly known for its collaborations and association with many American artists and celebrities.

Actor Justin Theroux, a longtime customer of the brand, has a frame named after him based on those his character wore in the 2001 movie Mulholland Drive.

In 2011, the company released a limit edition (only 350 pairs were available) of the Terry Richardson original frame, called "Terry".

In 2014, a limited edition "Grunya" frame designed with the collaboration of The Roots frontman Tariq Trotter was released.

Johnny Depp made the "Lemtosh" frames famous back in 2004, when the psychological thriller movie Secret Window came out.

In 2019, MOSCOT created The MILTZEN in Crystal with historical Rose Custom Made Tint™ for the SFMOMA in celebration of the critically acclaimed exhibit, Andy Warhol—From A to B and Back Again.

References

Eyewear brands of the United States
Eyewear retailers of the United States
American companies established in 1915
Manufacturing companies established in 1915
Retail companies established in 1915
Eyewear companies of the United States
Family-owned companies of the United States
Companies based in New York City
1915 establishments in New York (state)